The women's points race at the 2006 Dutch National Track Championships in Alkmaar took place at Sportpaleis Alkmaar on December 30, 2006

Competition format
There were no qualification rounds for this discipline. Consequently, the event was run direct to the final.

Final results (top 10)

Final results

References

2006 Dutch National track cycling championships
Dutch National Track Championships – Women's points race
Dutch